The 19th Special Forces Group (Airborne) (19th SFG) (A) is one of two National Guard groups of the United States Army Special Forces.  19th Group—as it is sometimes called—is designed to deploy and execute nine doctrinal missions: unconventional warfare, foreign internal defense, direct action, counter-insurgency, special reconnaissance, counter-terrorism, information operations, counterproliferation of weapon of mass destruction, and security force assistance. Headquartered in Draper, Utah, with detachments in Washington, West Virginia, Ohio, Rhode Island, Colorado, California and Texas, the 19th SFG(A) shares responsibility over Southwest Asia with the 5th Special Forces Group (Airborne), and the Pacific with the 1st Special Forces Group (Airborne). Company A, 2nd Battalion is one of several National Guard units with colonial roots.

History

The parent unit was constituted on 5 July 1942 in the Army of the United States as the 1st Company, 1st Battalion, Third Regiment, 1st Special Service Force, a combined Canadian-American organization.  This unit was activated on 9 July 1942 at Fort William Henry Harrison, Montana, then disbanded on 6 January 1945 in France.

19th Group was constituted on 15 April 1960 in the Regular Army as Headquarters, 19th Special Forces Group, 1st Special Forces.  One year later, on 1 May 1961, the unit was allotted to the Army National Guard; 19th Group was concurrently organized from existing units in Utah with headquarters at Fort Douglas.  Continuous reorganization developed over the next three decades, and by 1 September 1996, the unit consisted of elements from the Utah, California, Colorado, Ohio, Rhode Island, Washington, and West Virginia Army National Guards.

During the 2003 invasion of Iraq, a company element from the 19th SFG was attached to TF Dagger as were several regular and National Guard infantry companies to provide FOB security and to act as a QRF. As the prospect of war grew A company, 1st Battalion, 19th SFG, were tasked with liaison roles supporting conventional forces: ODA 911 and ODA 913 were to support the I MEF; ODA 914 was divided into two elements, one supporting the 3rd Infantry Division with ODA 916 and the other supporting British Forces; ODA 915 was attached to the 101st Airborne Division; and ODA 912 was tasked with providing PSD for General Harrell, the commander of CFSOCC (Combined Forces Special Operations Component Command).

On 1 October 2005, 1st Special Forces was redesignated as the 1st Special Forces Regiment.  Today's unit designation - Headquarters, 19th Special Forces Group, 1st Special Forces Regiment - was then established.

19th Group operators attend the same Special Forces selection and training as their active duty counterparts.  The unit deploys elements to conduct special, irregular, and counterterrorist operations in various places around the world.  Their official motto is De Oppresso Liber (Latin: "From oppressed [to] free"), a reference to one of their primary missions to train and assist foreign indigenous forces.

In September 2014, the Huffington Post reported that members of the 19th SFG were deployed to Morocco to take part in Operation Enduring Freedom – Trans Sahara.

Green Berets from the 19th SFG took part in the War in Afghanistan (2015–2021); A Company, 1st BTN, 19th SFG was deployed to Afghanistan in July 2015 and several members were decorated for their actions during December 2015 and January 2016. On 5 January 2016, during a major operation assisting Afghan forces reclaiming territory held by the Taliban,  SSG Matthew McClintock of A Company, 1st BTN, 19th SFG was killed by small arms fire during an hours long battle in the Marjah district, Helmand Province.

Controversially, from June 1 to June 7, 2020, during the George Floyd protests, members of the 19th SFG were deployed to Washington, DC and stationed outside the White House. Photos began to circulate of soldiers wearing the arrowhead patch and the Special Forces Tab. Questions rose as to why Special Forces soldiers were needed. On June 4, National Guard commanders made the decision to pull the Special Forces patches off the uniform in an attempt to avoid sending the wrong message.

Structure 
The structure of 19th Special Forces Group (Airborne) includes the following units:

 Headquarters and Headquarters Company (UT ARNG) - Camp W.G. Williams, Riverton, Utah
 1st Battalion
 Headquarters and Headquarters Detachment (UT ARNG) - Camp W.G. Williams, Riverton, Utah
 Company A (WA ARNG) - Buckley Armory, Buckley, Washington
 Company B (UT ARNG) - Camp W.G. Williams, Riverton, Utah
 Company C (CA ARNG) - Los Alamitos Joint Forces Training Base, Los Alamitos, California
 Support Company (UT ARNG) - Camp W.G. Williams, Riverton, Utah
 2nd Battalion
 Headquarters and Headquarters Detachment (WV ARNG) - SGM Earl R. Biggs Memorial Armed Forces Reserve Center, Kenova, West Virginia
 Company A (RI ARNG) - Middletown Armory, Middletown, Rhode Island
 Company B (OH ARNG) - Rickenbacker Air National Guard Base, Columbus, Ohio
 Company C (WV ARNG) - Camp Dawson, Kingwood, West Virginia
 Support Company (WV ARNG) -  SGM Earl R. Biggs Memorial Armed Forces Reserve Center, Kenova, West Virginia
 5th Battalion
 Headquarters and Headquarters Detachment  (CO ARNG) - Watkins Armory, Watkins, Colorado
 Company A (TX ARNG) - Camp Bullis, San Antonio, Texas
 Company B (CO ARNG) - Fort Carson Armory, Fort Carson, Colorado
 Company C (TX ARNG) - Camp Bullis, San Antonio, Texas
 Support Company (CO ARNG) - Watkins Armory, Watkins, Colorado
 Group Support Battalion
 Headquarters and Headquarters Company (UT ARNG) - John M. Browning Armory, Ogden, Utah
 Company A (UT ARNG) - John M. Browning Armory, Ogden, Utah
 Company B (UT ARNG) - John M. Browning Armory, Ogden, Utah
 Company C (UT ARNG) - Camp W.G. Williams, Riverton, Utah
 Company F (UT ARNG) - Camp W.G. Williams, Riverton, Utah
 Group Support Company (UT ARNG)
 Detachment 1 (WA ARNG)
 197th Special Troops Support Company (TX ARNG) (aligned) - Camp Bullis, San Antonio, Texas
 190th Chemical Detachment (MT ARNG) (aligned) - Fort William H. Harrison, Helena, Montana

Gallery

Mobilization
On 13 November 2001, the following units of the 19th SFG were called to active duty:

A Company, 1st Bn/19th SFG—Fort Lewis, Washington
B Company, C Company, and Support Company 1st Bn/19th SFG—Utah
A Company, 2nd Bn/19th SFG—Rhode Island
B Company, 2nd Bn/19th SFG—Ohio
C Company and Support Company, 2nd Bn/19th SFG—Kenova, West Virginia
A Company, B Company, C Company and Support Company from the 5th Bn/19th SFG—California & Colorado

Company A, 1st Bn/19th SFG participated in the 2003 invasion of Iraq

In April 2007, the 5th Battalion of 19th SFG and troops from the 2nd Battalion were called to Operation Iraqi Freedom.

A Company (California National Guard)
B Company (Colorado National Guard)
5th Bn/19th SFG Headquarters and Support Company, 5/19th

The unit came home with no deaths and very few minor injuries.

In April 2007, the following units of the 19th SFG were called to active duty (Operation Iraqi Freedom V)

 HHC, 19th SFG(A)—Utah

On September 2008, the following units of the 19th SFG were called to active duty (Operation Enduring Freedom XIII)

 A Company, 2nd Bn/19th SFG—Rhode Island
 B Company, 2nd Bn/19th SFG—Ohio
 C Company, 2nd Bn/19th SFG—Camp Dawson, West Virginia
 Support Company and HHC, 2nd Bn/19th SFG—Kenova, West Virginia

References

External links 

"It All Starts Here" | SF and Recruiting Information page for the 19th Special Forces Group (A) in Utah

 

Groups of the United States Army National Guard
Military units and formations established in 1961
Special Forces 019